Dagfinn Føllesdal (born 22 June 1932) is a Norwegian-American philosopher. He is the Clarence Irving Lewis Professor of Philosophy Emeritus at Stanford University, and professor emeritus at the University of Oslo.

Biography and career 

Føllesdal was born in Askim. After earning his bachelor's and master's degrees at the University of Oslo, he attended Harvard University and earned his Ph.D. in 1961 under Willard Van Orman Quine. He taught at Harvard University from 1961 to 1964, and began teaching at Stanford University in 1968.

Føllesdal is a member of the Norwegian Academy for Language and Literature, the Norwegian Academy of Science and Letters, the Royal Swedish Academy of Sciences, and the American Academy of Arts and Sciences.

He resides at Tanum. He is a practicing Roman Catholic. He regularly participates in the sport of Orienteering.

Philosophical work 

Føllesdal has written extensively on topics relating to the philosophy of language, phenomenology, existentialism, and hermeneutics. He was a pupil of Quine and is among the leading experts on the indeterminacy of translation.

Bibliography 
Referential Opacity and Modal logic. Oslo: Universitetsforlaget, 1966
"Quine on Modality." Synthese (December 1968), 19(1-2):147-157.
"Husserl's Notion of Noema." Journal of Philosophy (October 1969), 66(20):680-687.
"Indeterminacy of Translation and Under-Determination of the Theory of Nature." Dialectica (1973), 27:289-301.
"Essentialism and Reference." In Lewis Hahn, ed., The Philosophy of W. V. Quine, pp. 97–115. La Salle: Open Court, 1986.
"Indeterminacy and Mental States." In Perspectives on Quine. Oxford & Cambridge, Massachusetts: Blackwell, 1990.
"In What Sense Is Language Public?" In Paolo Leonardi, ed., On Quine: New Essays. New York & Cambridge: Cambridge University Press, 1995.
"Absorbed Coping, Husserl and Heidegger." In Mark A. Wrathall and Jeff Malpas, eds., Heidegger, Authenticity, and Modernity: Essays in Honor of Hubert L. Dreyfus, Volume 1, pp. 251–257. Cambridge, Massachusetts: MIT Press, 2000.

References

External links
 Stanford faculty profile 
 Interview with Dagfinn Føllesdal by Øystein Linnebo and Einar Duenger Bøhn in Norsk Filosofisk Tidsskrift (01/2020; Vol. 55). (also here)
 Interview with Dagfinn Føllesdal on some topics related to linguistics and communication . The interview belongs to the series Multi-Media Encyclopaedia of Philosophical Sciences.
An Interview with Dagfinn Føllesdal by Carl Korsnes for Filosofisk supplement 2/2015. (also here)
 Bibliography

1932 births
20th-century essayists
20th-century Norwegian non-fiction writers
20th-century Norwegian philosophers
21st-century essayists
21st-century Norwegian philosophers
Analytic philosophers
Catholic philosophers
Continental philosophers
Existentialists
Fellows of the American Academy of Arts and Sciences
Harvard University alumni
Hermeneutists
Living people
Members of the Norwegian Academy
Members of the Norwegian Academy of Science and Letters
Members of the Royal Swedish Academy of Sciences
Norwegian essayists
Norwegian expatriates in the United States
Norwegian logicians
Phenomenologists
Philosophers of language
Philosophers of logic
Philosophy writers
University of Oslo alumni
People from Askim